In the run up to the 2021 Russian legislative election, various organisations carried out opinion polling to gauge voting intention in Russia. The results of these polls are displayed in this article. Polls were conducted only for the 225 seats elected on the party list. Another 225 deputies are elected directly in single member constituencies, where the party can obtain a completely different result.

The date range for these opinion polls are from the 2016 Russian legislative election, held on 18 September, until mid-September 2021.

Graphical summary

Campaign polls
Polls conducted after the election is called.

Constituency polls

Kuntsevo constituency (No. 197)

Leningradsky constituency (No. 198)

Preobrazhensky constituency (No. 205)

Moscow Central constituency (No. 208)

Seat projection

All seats
Projections for all 450 seats.

Party lists
Projections for 225 out of 450 seats, elected by party lists.

Single-member constituencies
Projections for 225 out of 450 seats, elected by Single-member constituencies.

Pre-campaign polls
Opinion polls conducted prior to the campaign and the announcement of the list of participating parties. Parties with more than 5% support of the whole electorate (enough to enter State Duma while not adjusting for likely voters) are given in bold.

2021

2020

2019

2018

2017

2016

Regional polls and elections

Altai Republic

Buryatia

Crimea

Kabardino–Balkaria

Karachay–Cherkessia

Khakassia

Komi

Mari El

Tatarstan

Tuva

Yakutia

Kamchatka Krai

Khabarovsk Krai

Primorsky Krai

Zabaykalsky Krai

Amur Oblast

Bryansk Oblast

Vladimir Oblast

Volgograd Oblast

Ivanovo Oblast

Irkutsk Oblast

Kemerovo Oblast

Magadan Oblast

Rostov Oblast

Tula Oblast

Sakhalin Oblast

Jewish Autonomous Oblast

Chukotka Autonomous Okrug

Moscow

Sevastopol

Saint Petersburg

Local polls

Chelyabinsk

Polls by social groups

Entrepreneurs

Notes

Legislative 2021
Opinion polling